Philomene Long (August 17, 1940 – August 21, 2007) was an American poet. Long was born in Greenwich Village, New York City. From the 1960s onward, she lived most of her life in Venice, California. In 2005, she was made Poet Laureate of Venice.

Twin sister Pegarty Long is a producer and director, known for the films An Irish Vampire in Hollywood (2013) and Incision (1999)

References

1940 births
2007 deaths
American women poets
20th-century American poets
20th-century American women writers
21st-century American women